The following is a list of notable deaths in August 2006.

Entries for each day are listed alphabetically by surname. A typical entry lists information in the following sequence:
 Name, age, country of citizenship at birth, subsequent country of citizenship (if applicable), reason for notability, cause of death (if known), and reference.

August 2006

1

Vincent Dole, 93, American medical researcher, established that methadone could treat heroin addiction, ruptured aorta.
Rufus Harley, 70, American jazz bagpipe player, prostate cancer.
Arlene Raven, 62, American feminist writer and art critic, kidney cancer.
Jason Rhoades, 41, American installation artist, heart failure.
George Styles, 78, British army officer, awarded the George Cross.
Bob Thaves, 81, American cartoonist, created and illustrated Frank and Ernest, respiratory failure.
Johannes Willebrands, 96, Dutch Archbishop of Utrecht 1975–1983, oldest Cardinal in the Roman Catholic church.
Iris Marion Young, 57, American political philosopher and feminist, esophageal cancer.

2

Holger Börner, 75, German politician, prime minister of Hesse (1976–1987), cancer.
Fitz Eugene Dixon Jr., 82, American former owner of the Philadelphia 76ers who signed Julius Erving, skin cancer.
Maurice Kriegel-Valrimont, 92, French Resistance fighter, militant communist, and politician.
Audrey Lindvall, 23, American model and sister of American supermodel Angela Lindvall, traffic accident.
Kim McLagan, 57, British model of the 1960s, wife of Ian McLagan of The Faces and former wife of Keith Moon, traffic accident.
Gary Pajcic, 58, American athlete and lawyer.
Luisel Ramos, 22, Uruguayan model, heart failure caused by anorexia nervosa.
Ferenc Szusza, 82, Hungarian football player, record goalscorer for a single club in Hungarian football.
John Watters, 81, Australian cricketer.

3

John Haase, 82, German-born American dentist turned author, emphysema.
Arthur Lee, 61, American rock musician, leader of the psychedelic band Love, leukemia.
Ken Richmond, 80, British actor and wrestler, 1952 Olympic bronze medal winner, gong striker in the credits for films by J. Arthur Rank Studios.
Dame Elisabeth Schwarzkopf, 90, German-born opera soprano, natural causes.

4

Elden Auker, 95, American Major League Baseball pitcher, heart attack.
Julio Galán, 46, Mexican neo-expressionist painter, brain hemorrhage.
John Locke, 62, American keyboardist of Spirit, cancer.
Nandini Satpathy, 75, Indian politician and author, Chief Minister of Odisha, India 1972–1976, cerebral bleeding.
Esther Snyder, 86, American businesswoman, president of California-based In-N-Out Burger.

5

Susan Butcher, 51, American dog musher, four-time Iditarod Trail Sled Dog Race champion, complications from a bone marrow transplant to combat acute myeloid leukemia.
Aron Gurevich, 82, Russian medievalist.
Terry McRae, 65, Australian politician, Speaker of the South Australian House of Assembly.
Hugo Schiltz, 78, Belgian politician.
Daniel Schmid, 64, Swiss filmmaker and director (Il Bacio di Tosca), cancer.
Ed Thrasher, 74, American art director.

6

Esther Victoria Abraham, 89, Indian model, actress and film producer.
Ángel de Andrés, 88, Spanish theatre actor and director, heart attack.
Salvino Azzopardi, 75, Maltese Jesuit priest and philosopher.
Gintaras Beresnevičius, 45, Lithuanian historian of religions specializing in Baltic mythology, writer, scholar, publicist.
Dorothy Healey, 91, American communist leader, pneumonia.
Prince Christoph of Hohenlohe-Langenburg, 49, European socialite, massive organ failure after being imprisoned.
Rafik Kamalov, Kyrgyz Imam and alleged Islamic militant, injuries sustained from gunfire.
Stella Moray, 83, British actress and performer.
Jim Pomeroy, 53, American professional motocross racer, first American to win a World Championship Motocross event, automobile accident.
Milcho Rusev, 81-82, Bulgarian Olympic cyclist.
Moacir Santos, 80, Brazilian composer and arranger.
Sir Robert Sparkes, 77, Australian grazier and businessman, former President of the Queensland National Party (1970–1990).
Hirotaka Suzuoki, 56, Japanese anime voice actor, lung cancer.
Ian Walters, 76, British sculptor.
Lawrence Wnuk, 98, Polish Roman Catholic priest, Protonotary Apostolic, founder of the Polish Canadian Centre Association of Windsor, Ontario.

7

Mary Anderson Bain, 94, American politician, New Deal director under U.S. President Franklin D. Roosevelt and former top aide to Congressman Sid Yates.
Jim Crooker, 80, American amateur golfer, amateur who played in more Bob Hope Chrysler Classic tournaments than any other golfer, cancer.
John Gilbert, 84, Canadian politician.
Lois January, 92, American actress, Alzheimer's disease.
Bob Miller, 76, American football player, NFL defensive tackle with the title-winning Detroit Lions, cancer.
John Weinberg, 81, American banker, former head of Goldman Sachs, complications from a fall.

8

Gustavo Arcos, 79, Cuban dissident, pneumonia.
Slavko Brankov, 55, Croatian actor.
Duke Jordan, 84, American bebop jazz pianist.
Dino Restelli, 81, American Major League Baseball player.
Chandra Prasad Saikia, 79, Indian writer.
Antonieta Zevallos de Prialé, 87, Peruvian politician, deputy (1980–1985).

9

Gianfranco Bellini, 82, Italian actor and voice actor.
George Chapman, 85, Englist faith healer.
Colin Dickinson, 74, New Zealand Olympic cyclist.
Anga Díaz, 45, Cuban conga player,  heart attack.
Jenny Gröllmann, 59, German actress (I Was Nineteen, Peas at 5:30), breast cancer.
Melissa Hayden, 83, Canadian-born ballerina, former principal dancer with the New York City Ballet, pancreatic cancer.
Philip Empson High, 92, British science fiction author, natural causes.
Said Abdullo Nuri, 59, Tajik leader of the Islamic Renaissance Party of Tajikistan, cancer.
Rafael Ruiz, 89, Spanish Olympic field hockey player (1948).
James Van Allen, 91, American space physicist, heart failure.

10

George Dawkes, 86, English cricketer, specialising in wicket keeping, for Derbyshire.
Barbara George, 63, American R&B singer, lung infection.
Irving São Paulo, 41, Brazilian actor, multiple organ failure.
Yasuo Takei, 76, Japanese second-richest man of Japan and founder of Takefuji Corporation.

11

Alvin Cooperman, 83, American entertainment executive.
David Thomas Dawson, 48, American convicted murderer, execution by lethal injection.
Mike Douglas, 86, American talk-show host and entertainer.
Alice Ilchman, 71, American economist, president of Sarah Lawrence College, (1981–1998).
Mazisi Kunene, 76, South African poet laureate.
Yevgeny Sinyayev, 58, Soviet Olympic sprinter.

12

Victoria Gray Adams, 79, American civil rights activist, first woman to run for a US Senate seat in Mississippi, cancer.
Noel Everett, 70, New Zealand Olympic sailor 
Camille Loiseau, 114, French doyenne, oldest verified person in Western Europe.
Raska Lukwiya, Ugandan commander in the Lord's Resistance Army, indictee of the International Criminal Court for war crimes, killed in battle.
Keren Tendler, 26, Israeli soldier and airborne mechanic, helicopter crash.
Nicholas Webster, 94, American film and television director.

13

Bill Baker, 95, American baseball player.
Joseph Carlino, 89, American Speaker of the New York State Assembly (1959–1964).
Jack Edwards, 88, British World War II soldier and prisoner of war rights campaigner.
Kermit L. Hall, 61, American President of the University at Albany, member of the 1992 Kennedy Assassination Records Review Board, swimming accident.
Al Hostak, 90, American National Boxing Association middleweight champion (1938–1939), stroke.
Tony Jay, 73, British actor and voice artist, complications from tumor surgery.
Jon Nödtveidt, 31, Swedish lead guitarist and vocalist (Dissection), convicted of felony murder, suicide.
Payao Poontarat, 49, Thai boxer, first Thai Olympic medal winner (bronze, 1976), World Boxing Council champion, amyotrophic lateral sclerosis.

14

William Ian Beardmore Beveridge, 98, Australian animal pathologist.
Johnny Duncan, 67, American country singer and songwriter, heart attack.
John Godley, 3rd Baron Kilbracken, 85, British-born Irish peer, wartime Fleet Air Arm pilot and journalist.
Adriaan de Groot, 91, Dutch chess master and psychologist.
Bruno Kirby, 57, American character actor (The Godfather Part II, City Slickers), complications from leukemia.
Luis Fernandez de la Reguera, 39, American film director, motorcycle accident.

15

Rick Bourke, 51, Australian rugby league player, cancer.
William Branson, 68, American economist.
Lynton K. Caldwell, 92, American political scientist.
Dame Te Atairangikaahu, 75, New Zealand Māori queen.
Doug White, 61, American news anchor, cancer.
Faas Wilkes, 82, Dutch international footballer.

16

Umberto Baldini, 84, Italian art restorer, director of the conservation studios at the Uffizi.
Alex Buzo, 62, Australian playwright, cancer.
Herschel Green, 86, American World War II fighter ace.
Iris M. Ovshinsky, 79, American co-founder of ECD Ovonics, wife of inventor Stanford Ovshinsky.
Alfredo Stroessner, 93, Paraguayan President (1954–1989), complications from hernia surgery.
Alan Vint, 61, American actor, multiple organ failure.
William Wasson, 82, American priest who founded orphanages, complications from a hip injury.

17

Kontek Kamariah Ahmad, 95, Malaysian educationist, politician, activist and pioneer in the Malaysian co-operative movement.
Len Evans, 75, Australian wine writer, founder of the Australian Wine Bureau, heart attack.
Ken Goodall, 59, Irish rugby union player (1967–1970).
Masumi Hayashi, 60, American photographer, shot.
John Hutton, 59, American furniture designer, complications of prostate cancer surgery.
Vernon Ingram, 82, German-born American molecular biologist (MIT), discovered cause of sickle cell anemia.
Walter Jagiello, 76, American polka musician and songwriter.
Christopher Polge, 80, English biologist.
Shamsur Rahman, 76, Bangladeshi poet, kidney and liver failure.
Bernard Rapp, 61, French film director, writer and journalist, lung cancer.
Sig Shore, 87, American film producer (Super Fly).
Evan Harris Walker, 70, American physicist and consciousness theorist.
Yen Ngoc Do, 65, Vietnamese-born American founder of Nguoi Viet Daily News, diabetes and kidney disease.

18

George Astaphan, 60, Kittitian doctor, provided steroids to Ben Johnson.
James A. Clark, Jr., 87, American President of the Maryland State Senate (1979–1983), cancer.
Samuel Flippen, 36, American convicted murderer, execution by lethal injection.
Kathryn Frost, 57, American Army major general, wife of Martin Frost, breast cancer. 
Fernand Gignac, 72, Canadian singer and actor, hepatitis.
Ken Kearney, 82, Australian rugby league and rugby union international player, heart attack.

19

Marvin Barrett, 86, American journalist and author.
Joyce Blair, 73, British actress, sister of Lionel Blair, cancer.
Clinton Bristow, Jr., 57, American lawyer and education official, president of Alcorn State University, heart failure.
Joseph Hill, 57, Jamaican lead singer of roots reggae group Culture, liver failure.
Óscar Míguez, 78, Uruguayan footballer, 1950 FIFA World Cup winner.
Mervyn Wood, 89, Australian rower, three-time Olympic medal winner, New South Wales Police Commissioner.

20

Claude Blanchard, 74, Canadian pop singer and actor, heart attack.
Renate Brausewetter, 100, German silent film actress.
Bryan Budd, 29, British soldier, posthumously awarded Victoria Cross.
Roger Donoghue, 75, American boxer.
Robert Hoffman, 59, American businessman and art collector, co-founder of National Lampoon.
Jack Laughery, 71, American CEO and chairman of the Hardee's restaurant chain, lung cancer.
Vashti McCollum, 93, American humanist campaigner.
Jacob Mincer, 84, Polish-born American professor of economics (Columbia University).
Giuseppe Moccia, 75, Italian film director.
Joe Rosenthal, 94, American Pulitzer Prize-winning photographer (Raising the Flag on Iwo Jima), natural causes.
Neil Trezise, 75, Australian Labor politician, Victorian Minister for Sport (1982–1992), Australian rules football player, heart attack.
Richard de Yarburgh-Bateson, 6th Baron Deramore, 95, British architect and writer of erotic fiction.

21

Máximo Carvajal, 70, Chilean comic book artist.
Bismillah Khan, 90, Indian shehnai musician and Bharat Ratna winner, heart attack.
Jon Lilletun, 60, Norwegian politician (KrF), Minister of Education (1997–2000), cancer.
Geff Noblet, 89, Australian test cricketer (1949–1953).
William Norris, 95, American engineer, founder of Control Data Corporation.
Buck Page, 84, American western musician, founder of Riders of the Purple Sage.
Paul Fentener van Vlissingen, 65, Dutch billionaire businessman, pancreatic cancer.
S. Yizhar, 89, Israeli author, heart disease.

22

Bruce Gary, 55, American drummer (The Knack), lymphoma.
Frank Lennon, 79, Canadian photographer.
Magnús Helgi Magnússon, 83, Icelandic politician, Minister of Social Affairs.
Simeon Anthony Pereira, 78, Pakistani Archbishop Emeritus of Karachi.

23

Maynard Ferguson, 78, Canadian jazz trumpet player, kidney and liver failure.
Sven Grönblom, 92, Finnish Olympic sailor 
John Lister, 90, British Anglican priest, Provost of Wakefield (1972–1982).
Nigel Malim, 87, British admiral.
Ayyappa Paniker, 75, Indian poet and academic.
Wasim Raja, 54, Pakistani test cricketer, heart attack.
Raymond Harold Sawkins, 82, British novelist.
David Schnaufer, 53, American Appalachian dulcimer player, lung cancer.
Marie Tharp, 86, American oceanographic cartographer.
Ed Warren, 79, American demonologist, after long illness.
Jacques Wildberger, 84, Swiss composer.
Jay Young, 56, American news anchor (CNN), heart attack.

24

Herbert Hupka, 91, German journalist and politician.
Leonard Levy, 83, Canadian-born American constitutional historian and author, winner of the 1969 Pulitzer Prize for History.
Cristian Nemescu, 27, Romanian film director, car accident.
Viktor Pavlov, 65, Russian actor, heart attack.
Rocco Petrone, 80, American NASA engineer, director of Project Apollo and the Marshall Space Flight Center.
David Plowright, 75, British television producer and executive, chairman of Granada Television (1987–1992).
Ralph Schoenstein, 73, American humorist and NPR commentator.
Léopold Simoneau, 90, Canadian lyric tenor.
James Tenney, 72, American experimental music composer, cancer.
Gene Thompson, 89, American baseball player (Cincinnati Reds, New York Giants).
Andrei Toncu, 28, Romanian sound designer, car accident.
John Weinzweig, 93, Canadian composer.

25

John Blankenstein, 57, Dutch openly gay football referee, kidney disease.
Noor Hassanali, 88, Trinidadian politician, President (1987–1997).
Silva Kaputikyan, 87, Armenian poet.
Vijay Mehra, 68, Indian cricketer.
Joseph Stefano, 84, American screenwriter (Psycho), co-creator of The Outer Limits.
Ross Warneke, 54, Australian television presenter and radio personality, cancer.

26

Rainer Barzel, 82, German President of the Bundestag, Chairman of the CDU.
Earl Jolly Brown, 66, American actor (Live and Let Die).
Akbar Bugti, 79, Pakistani Balochistan rebel tribal leader, shot.
Sir Robin Fearn, 71, British diplomat, ambassador to Cuba and  Spain.
John Ripley Forbes, 93, American naturalist and conservationist, founder of nature museums.
William Garnett, 89, American aerial photographer.
Yevhen Kucherevskyi, 65, Ukrainian football coach (Dnipro Dnipropetrovsk), car crash.
Marie-Dominique Philippe, 93, French Dominican priest, founder of the Community of St. John, stroke.
Sir Alfred Sherman, 86, British journalist, writer and political analyst.
Vladimir Tretchikoff, 92, Russian artist.
Sir Clyde Walcott, 80, Barbadian cricketer.

27

María Capovilla, 116, Ecuadorian supercentenarian, oldest person in the world, pneumonia.
Tee Corinne, 62, American writer and artist, liver cancer.
Jon Dough, 43, American pornographic actor and AVN Hall of Famer, suicide by hanging.
Paul Gutty, 63, French cyclist.
Ike Hildebrand, 79, Canadian ice hockey and lacrosse player.
Juan Ignacio Larrea Holguín, 79, Ecuadorian Archbishop of Guayaquil.
Luciano Mendes de Almeida, 75, Brazilian Archbishop of Mariana, cancer.
Hrishikesh Mukherjee, 83, Indian film director.
David Nicholson, 67, British jockey and horse trainer.
Jerrold M. North 74, American diplomat.
Jesse Pintado, 37, American guitarist (Terrorizer, Napalm Death), complications of diabetic coma.

28

Ed Benedict, 94, American animator and layout artist, designed Fred Flintstone.
Sankho Chaudhuri, 90, Indian sculptor.
Don Chipp, 81, Australian politician, founder of the Australian Democrats.
Mary Lee Robb Cline, 80, American actress (The Great Gildersleeve), heart failure.
Ludwig Hemauer, 89, Swiss Olympic shooter.
Heino Lipp, 84, Estonian champion decathlete.
Iain MacKintosh, 74, Scottish folk musician, laryngeal cancer.
Robert McDermott, 86, American dean of the USAF Academy, chairman of USAA and owner of San Antonio Spurs, stroke.
Pip Pyle, 56, British drummer (Gong, Hatfield and the North).
William F. Quinn, 87, American Governor of Hawaii (1957–1962), pneumonia.
Michael Richard, 58, American photographer, cancer.
Benoît Sauvageau, 42, Canadian Bloc Québécois MP, traffic accident.
Melvin Schwartz, 73, American physicist, winner of the 1988 Nobel Prize in Physics.
Alfred Sherman, 86, British co-founder of the Centre for Policy Studies.

29

Kent Andersson, 64, Swedish motorcycle racer, winner of 1973 and 1974 125cc World Championships.
John Cummins, 58, Australian union official, secretary of the Builders' Labourers Federation, cancer.
Robert J. Gorlin, 83, American oral pathologist.
Gerald Green, 84, American author (The Last Angry Man) and screenwriter (Holocaust).
Benjamin Rawitz-Castel, 60, Israeli pianist, murdered.
John Scandrett, 91, New Zealand cricketer.
Jumpin' Gene Simmons, 73, American rockabilly musician.
Bill Stewart, 63, British actor.

30

Robin Cooke, Baron Cooke of Thorndon, 80, New Zealand jurist.
Glenn Ford, 90, Canadian-born American actor (Blackboard Jungle, Cimarron).
Susan Lynn Hefle, 46, American food scientist, cancer.
Margaret Hubble, 91, British radio broadcaster.
Emrys Jones, 86, British geographer.
Igor Kio, 62, Russian illusionist.
Bob LeRose, 85, American colorist and cover production artist for DC Comics.
Naguib Mahfouz, 94, Egyptian winner of 1988 Nobel Prize for Literature, head injuries from a fall.
Hector Monro, Baron Monro of Langholm, 83, British MP and government minister.
Bill Stumpf, 70, American industrial designer, co-created the Aeron office chair.

31

Mohamed Abdelwahab, 22, Egyptian footballer, suspected heart attack.
K. Sri Dhammananda, 87, Sri Lankan-born Malaysian bhikkhu, stroke.
Guy Gabaldon, 80, American World War II marine, heart attack.
J. S. Holliday, 82, American historian, expert on California Gold Rush, pulmonary fibrosis.
David Macpherson, 2nd Baron Strathcarron, 82, British hereditary peer and motoring expert.
Mike Magill, 86, American racing driver.
Charlie Wagner, 93, American baseball player (Boston Red Sox).

References

2006-08
 08